A special election was held in  on December 16, 1790 to fill a vacancy left when Representative-elect Pierpont Edwards (P) declined to serve.

Election results

See also 
 Special elections to the 1st United States Congress

References 

Connecticut 1790
Connecticut 1790
Connecticut Special
1790 Special
United States House of Representatives 1790 At-large
1790 Connecticut elections